Henry Nes (May 20, 1799 – September 10, 1850) was an American medical doctor and politician.

Biography
Nes was born in York, Pennsylvania. He graduated from Princeton College (the New Jersey institution which changed its name to Princeton University in 1896). After his graduation he studied medicine, and then returned to York to practice.

Political career
Nes ran as an Independent Democrat for one of the Pennsylvania seats in the US House of Representatives in the 28th United States Congress (1842). He was successful, and served from 1843 to 1845.

In 1846 Nes ran as a Whig candidate for the same seat in the 30th United States Congress and was elected. In 1848 he ran for re-election, and was again successful.

Nes served in the 31st United States Congress from March until September 1850, when he died in office. A special election was held to fill his seat; the winner was Joel Buchanan Danner.

During his congressional service Nes served as chairman of the United States House Committee on Invalid Pensions and the United States House Committee on Revisal and Unfinished Business, both during the Thirtieth Congress.

Death
Nes died on September 10, 1850.  He was buried in York's Prospect Hill Cemetery.

See also
List of United States Congress members who died in office (1790–1899)

Sources

The Political Graveyard

1799 births
1850 deaths
Physicians from Pennsylvania
Politicians from York, Pennsylvania
Princeton University alumni
Pennsylvania Democrats
Pennsylvania Independents
Independent Democrat members of the United States House of Representatives
Whig Party members of the United States House of Representatives from Pennsylvania
19th-century American politicians